Betta spilotogena is a species of gourami endemic to Indonesia where it is only known from the islands of Bintan and Singkep. This species grows to a length of  SL.

References

spilotogena
Freshwater fish of Indonesia
Taxa named by Ng Peter Kee Lin
Taxa named by Maurice Kottelat
Fish described in 1994
Taxonomy articles created by Polbot